Jeffrey L. Gurian is an American dentist and comedian.

Early life
Jeffrey Gurian was born in 1956 in the Bronx borough of New York City to parents Raymond Gurian, a liquor salesman, and Marjorie Gurian. Gurian attended William Taft High School and Hunter College for post-secondary school. After college, Gurian graduated from the Maurice H. Kornberg School of Dentistry at Temple University. There, he is reported to have been "in constant trouble over his coiffure, his clothes and his laid-back lifestyle" according to The New York Times.

Gurian is a former stutterer and has discussed his cure during his many appearances on Frank Morano’s WABC-770AM radio show, “The Other Side of Midnight.” 

Gurian has described realizing that stuttering could be cured when he noticed that he only stuttered in front of other people. “I thought,” Gurian said on Morano’s show, “a person with leg pain has it in every room, so stuttering must be situational.” 

That led Gurian to cure himself of stuttering, which he now freely shares to others through his website.

Dental career
After graduation, Gurian became a practicing dentist in the field of Cosmetic dentistry, specializing in correcting teeth that have been misshapen by birth defects, drugs such as tetracycline or conditions like obsessive teeth grinding." Gurian maintained a dental practice in New York City until 1996, in the neighborhood of Marble Hill.  He then became an Assoc. Clinical Prof. at N.Y.U. College of Dentistry in the Oral Medicine/Oro-Facial Pain Department, until 2011.

Comedy career

Gurian has stated that, "From the age of 12, I wanted to be both a dentist and a comedy writer ... No one knows why, not even me, but it might have something to do with my parents who were the only Jewish couple in the Bronx who didn't want a doctor in the family." As a dentist he has toured the United States lecturing on the subject since the 1980s. When asked about the balance of his two careers in 1992, he wrote, "I am indeed a serious dentist and a serious comedy writer."
Early in his career, Gurian wrote jokes performed by comedians including, Dick Capri, Freddie Roman, Dick Shawn, Jerry Lewis, Richard Belzer, Robin Williams, David N. Dinkins and Milton Berle, who stated of Gurian that, "I think he has a great comic sense ... He knows what's funny and what's not, most of the time. I took him under my wing, and gave him the dos and don'ts of what to write and what not to write." Berle also sponsored Gurian's membership in the New York Friars Club. Gurian was introduced to Berle by Rodney Dangerfield, whom Gurian worked for as Dangerfield first began to gain a national profile in the United States. He met Dangerfield through his connection to Alan Zweibel of Saturday Night Live, after which Dangerfield used jokes from Gurian on several of Dangerfield's appearances on The Tonight Show Starring Johnny Carson and one of Dangerfield's comedy albums.
Gurian has also provided jokes to be read by individuals such as the Mayor of New York City, and wrote jokes for stage scripts for Jackie Mason. He also claims to have worked with Phil Hartman and Joan Rivers. In 2013, Gurian was a guest on the comedy talk show Oh, Hello!

Publishing

Gurian is a former contributor to New York Comedy World, Laugh Spin and Punchline Magazine. He is also the co-author of the book Filthy, Funny and Totally Offensive. In 2013, Gurian released a book entitled Make 'Em Laugh: 35 Years of the Comic Strip, the Greatest Comedy Club of All Time. The book traces the history of the Comic Strip Live comedy club in New York City, from its opening in 1976 forwards. Gurian spent four years researching the history of the club in order to complete the manuscript, research that included interviewing about fifty of the significant comedians to work at the club, including Billy Crystal, Eddie Murphy, Ray Romano and Jerry Seinfeld, who first started their stand-up careers at the club. Comedian Chris Rock, wrote the foreword for the book.

Film career
In 2003, Gurian wrote the short comedy film I Am Woody about a mob boss who survives an attempt on his life, then wakes with amnesia and the believes he is Woody Allen. The film won the Best Short Film award at the 2003 New York International Independent Film and Video Festival and best actor, going to John Glenn Hoyt. In 2012, Gurian co-produced a documentary called The Business of Comedy, which was shown at festivals including the Gold Coast International Film Festival. He has also been a writer for the New York Friars Club roasts of Jerry Stiller, Hugh Hefner and Rob Reiner broadcast on Comedy Central. Gurian is the host of ComedyMatters.TV, a web-series featuring interviews with comedians and film stars at red carpet events. Many of the episodes use the Comedy Strip as the backdrop for the interviews.

Other work
Jeffrey Gurian has served as the head of live comedy programming for the Gold Coast International Film Festival. Gurian has also been interviewed regarding current events in the comedy world by news outlets including ABC News. He appeared on CNN, WPIX News and other TV stations discussing the passing of both Robin Williams and Joan Rivers.

References

External links
 ComedyMatters.TV
 

American male comedians
Temple University alumni
Hunter College alumni
Living people
American comedy writers
21st-century American historians
American male screenwriters
Film producers from New York (state)
American dentists
People from the Bronx
Male actors from New York City
American stand-up comedians
Comedians from New York City
American male non-fiction writers
Screenwriters from New York (state)
Historians from New York (state)
21st-century American screenwriters
21st-century American male writers
Year of birth missing (living people)